The handloom industry in Tangail is one of the oldest cottage industries of West Bengal. This traditional saree is produced in Tangail district and is named after the place.

Origin and evaluation

The handloom industry in Tangail was evolved during the last decades of nineteenth century. The weavers of this Tangail cloths are the successors of the famous Muslin weavers. They were originally from Dhamrai and Chowhatta of Dhaka district and were invited to Tangail by the Jamidars (landlords) of Delduar, Santosh and Gharinda. The weavers made settlement in twenty two adjacent villages of Tangail.
At first they weaved only plain cloth.  The Swadeshi movement called by Mahatma Gandhi in 1906 aimed to boycott cotton textiles from Lancashire inspired the use of local cotton cloths and the handloom industry in then East Bengal (present day Bangladesh) flourished at that time. During 1923–24 motifs and designs were introduce on saree. Jacquard looms were introduced during 1931–1932 for making saree.

Present condition of the industry
The handloom industry in Tangail is a cottage industry and the looms are mostly installed in households. 72% of the total installed looms has a unit size of five looms. Units with six to ten looms are 11% and units with eleven to twenty looms are 6% of the total. Units with twenty-one onward looms occupy 11% of the total and are considered as small factories. However, a study done by the Ministry of Industries in 1982, shows that small factories have 20% of handlooms. In the year 1992, there were over 100,000 handlooms and 1,50000 weavers in Tangail locating in Sadar, Kalihati, Nagarpur, and Basail upazilas. In the year 2008 there were 37222 handlooms in 10000 small and big handloom factories and there were more than 70000 weavers working under the Basic Centres in several upazilas of Tangail. A survey conducted in 2013 said there are 60,000 looms in Tangail. Of them, 8,305 are pit looms, 51,141 are Chittranjan looms and 892 are power looms.

Tangail handloom is popular all over the world for its uniqueness. The workers need to have special skills to weave and design Tangail saree. The Basak community of Patrail union of Tangail is a community of weavers who are still continuing the original making process of Tangail Saree. The weavers sell the saree in temporary bazaars that sit only twice a week in Bazitpur and Korotia. Traders come to these bazaars to purchase saree.

Types of Tangail handloom saree

 Cotton Saree 
 Half Silk Saree
 Soft Silk Saree
 Cotton Jamdani Saree
 Gas-mercerised Saree
 Twisted Cotton Saree
 Dangoo Saree
 Balucherri Saree

Export of Tangail handloom
Tangail Saree is in demand in many countries, like India, America, Japan, Middle East and some European countries. Each week Bangladesh exports around 50,000 piece saree to India.

Existing problems
The handloom industry is in crisis because of the increase in price of thread, yarn, dye and other raw materials and insufficient transportation and supply chain facilities. As a result, many weavers are leaving their profession and migrating.

References

Further reading 
 
 
 
 
 

Textile industry of Bangladesh
Tangail District
Economic history of Bangladesh
Cottage Industry in Bangladesh
Bangladeshi handicrafts